The 1966 United States Senate election in Illinois took place on November 8, 1966. Incumbent Democratic United States Senator Paul Douglas, seeking a fourth term in the United States Senate, faced off against Republican Charles H. Percy, a businessman and the 1964 Republican nominee for Governor of Illinois. A competitive election ensued, featuring campaign appearances by former vice president Richard M. Nixon on behalf of Percy. Ultimately, Percy ended up defeating Senator Douglas by a fairly wide margin, allowing him to win what would be the first of three terms in the Senate.

Election information
The primary (held on June 14) and general election coincided with those for House and state elections.

Turnout
Turnout in the primaries was 27.13%, with 1,509,302 votes cast.

Turnout during the general election was 71.56%, with a total of 3,822,724 votes cast.

Democratic primary
Incumbent Paul Douglas was renominated, running unopposed.

Candidates
Paul Douglas, incumbent U.S. Senator

Results

Republican primary
Businessman Charles H. Percy won the Republican primary by a large margin.

Candidates
Howard J. Doyle
Charles H. Percy, businessman and 1964 Illinois gubernatorial nominee
Lar Daly, perennial candidate

Results

Write-in candidates
Maxwell Primack
Robert Sabonjian, Mayor of Waukegan

General election

Results

See also 
 United States Senate elections, 1966

References

Illinois
1966
United States Senate